Claude Ballot-Léna (4 August 1936 – 5 December 1999) was a French racing driver born in Paris.

Career
He won the 1969 Spa 24 Hours in a Porsche 911 and the 1983 24 Hours of Daytona in a Porsche 935 Turbo owned by Preston Henn. He also entered the 24 Hours of Le Mans many times from 1966 until the 1980s and other than record holder Tom Kristensen has scored the most class victories at Le Mans with seven wins driving Porsche, Ferrari and Jaguar GT class cars. Ballot-Léna was also one of the earliest European NASCAR drivers when he made six Winston Cup starts in 1978 to 1979 at Talladega Superspeedway, Daytona International Speedway, and Atlanta Motor Speedway.

He died on 9 November 1999 in Paris from cancer.

Motorsports career results

24 Hours of Le Mans results

NASCAR
(key) (Bold – Pole position awarded by qualifying time. Italics – Pole position earned by points standings or practice time. * – Most laps led.)

Winston Cup Series

Daytona 500

References

External links
 

1936 births
1999 deaths
24 Hours of Daytona drivers
24 Hours of Le Mans drivers
24 Hours of Spa drivers
French racing drivers
NASCAR drivers
Racing drivers from Paris
World Sportscar Championship drivers
Porsche Motorsports drivers
Team Joest drivers
Jaguar Racing drivers
Graff Racing drivers